"You Ask Me To" is a song written by Billy Joe Shaver and Waylon Jennings. It was originally recorded by Jennings on his 1973 album Honky Tonk Heroes. This record spent fifteen weeks on the Billboard country singles charts, reaching a peak of number eight. Shaver recorded his own version in 1977 titled "You Asked Me To" in the past tense for the album Gypsy Boy, with special guest Willie Nelson on guitar and vocals. "You Ask Me To" also appeared as the closing song on Elvis Presley's 1975 album Promised Land. It was recorded in December 1973 at Stax Records studios in Memphis and released on Presley's 40th birthday. It also appeared with an alternate arrangement in Elvis Presley's posthumous 1981 album Guitar Man, which reached the Top 50 in the US.

Chart performance

Waylon Jennings version

Billy Joe Shaver version

References

1973 singles
Waylon Jennings songs
Elvis Presley songs
Billy Joe Shaver songs
Songs written by Billy Joe Shaver
Songs written by Waylon Jennings
RCA Victor singles
1973 songs